Abner Cloud House, also known as Sawmill Farm, Mansion Farm, and the John S. Petitdemange House, is a historic home located near Wilmington, New Castle County, Delaware. It was built about 1822, and consists of a two-story, side-gable, double-pile main section, a two-story, gable-roof, original kitchen wing; and a one-story, 20th century modern kitchen wing. It is constructed of stone and is in a vernacular Federal style.  Also on the property is a -story gable-roof, frame and stone outbuilding.

It was added to the National Register of Historic Places in 1992.

References

Houses on the National Register of Historic Places in Delaware
Federal architecture in Delaware
Houses completed in 1822
Houses in Wilmington, Delaware
National Register of Historic Places in Wilmington, Delaware
1822 establishments in Delaware